Christian Gottlieb Geissler (1729 Augsburg - 2 November 1814 Geneva) was a German-Swiss copperplate engraver, painter and printmaker, specialising in natural history, who moved to Geneva in about 1771 where he became a Swiss citizen. He was the son of Adam Geissler, a garden designer. Geissler is probably best known for his illustrating of Tabulae Phytographicae, an encyclopaedic work published by the Zurich naturalist Johannes Gessner (1709-1790), whose natural history collection Geissler also depicted.

Between 1744 and 1749 Geissler was an apprentice of the Augsburg miniaturist, Samuel Baumeister. He subsequently went to Nurnberg where he helped to illustrate Franz Michael Regenfuss's work Choix de Coquillages et de Crustacés. In 1753 he travelled to Zurich to join Gessner in the production of the 24-part Tabulae Phytographicae, which first appeared in 1795. Following this he moved to Geneva where he worked with the enamel painter Süß, and founded a school of drawing and worked as a copperplate engraver.

-

References

Botanical illustrators